César Muñoz Vicuña (1929–2000) was an Ecuadorian chess master. An amateur, he was an engineer by profession.

He played for Ecuador at first board in the fourth World Student Team Chess Championship at Reykjavík 1957 (+3 –6 =4), where he beat already reputed Fridrik Olafsson, and Bent Larsen.

At the 14th Chess Olympiad at Leipzig 1960 (+9 –3 =7), the unknown Ecuadorian caused a sensation in the preliminaries of the Leipzig Olympiad when he beat Bobby Fischer.

In 1962, he took second place, behind Olavo Yépez, in Pichincha (ECU-ch); and took seventh place at Quito 1969 (zonal; Eleazar Jiménez and Olavo Yépez Obando won).

For a number of years he was chair of the Ecuadorean Sports Association, and the Complejo Deportivo César Muñoz Vicuña was named after him.

Notable chess games
Bent Larsen vs César Muñoz, Reykjavík 1957, 4th World Student Team Chess Championship, English, A15, 0-1
Robert James Fischer vs César Muñoz, Leipzig 1960, 14th Olympiad, Sicilian, Dragon, Yugoslav Attack, B77, 0-1

References

Ecuadorian chess players
1929 births
2000 deaths
20th-century chess players